Elections to the United States House of Representatives in Florida for two seats in the 57th Congress were held November 6, 1900, at the same time as the election for president and the election for governor.

Background
Two Democrats had been re-elected in the previous election year, continuing the long Democratic domination of Florida (and other Southern States) politics.

Election results

See also
1900 United States House of Representatives elections

References

1900
Florida
United States House of Representatives